Mioquerquedula is an extinct genus of ducks from the Middle Miocene containing two species, M. minutissima and M. velox. It was one of the smallest anseriforms known. The genus was erected by Nikita Zelenkov and Evgenii Nikolaievich Kurochkin in 2012.

See also 
 African pygmy goose
 Cotton pygmy goose
 Smallest organisms

References

Anatidae
Fossil taxa described in 2012
Neogene birds of Asia
Prehistoric bird genera